Omorgus pellosomus is a species of hide beetle in the subfamily Omorginae.

References

pellosomus
Beetles described in 1986